Herman Brood & His Wild Romance is an export album by Dutch rock and roll and blues group Herman Brood & His Wild Romance. Released only in the United States, it contained most of the songs from his second studio album, Shpritsz. The main differences between the two albums were omission of the song "One", slightly modified times and track order, and the U.S. single version of "Saturday Night" which features different lyrics from the original version. Some versions of the LP contained the entire 5:07 minute version of "Saturday Night."  The album was a moderate success, reaching #122 on the Billboard chart for pop albums. As a result, Brood sought to open up the American market, recording the follow-up, Go Nutz, in the US.

Track listing

Personnel
Herman Brood - piano, keyboard, vocals
Freddy Cavalli - bass
Danny Lademacher - guitar
Cees Meerman - drums
 Peter Walrecht - voormalig drummer

References 

Herman Brood & His Wild Romance albums
1979 compilation albums
Ariola Records compilation albums